The 1987 Badminton World Cup was the ninth edition of an international tournament Badminton World Cup. The event was held in 1987. China won titles in all disciplines except men's doubles event, which was secured by South Korea.

Medalists

Men's singles

Finals

Women's singles

Finals

Men's doubles

Finals

Women's doubles

Finals

Mixed doubles

Finals

References 
 https://web.archive.org/web/20061214225022/http://tangkis.tripod.com/world/1987.htm
 Helah jaguh untuk kelirukan lawan
 Battle of lethal left-handers

Badminton World Cup
1987 in badminton
1987 in Malaysian sport
Sports competitions in Kuala Lumpur
International sports competitions hosted by Malaysia